Ryan Lo (born 26 February 1997) is a Singaporean sailor. He competed in the Laser event at the 2020 Summer Olympics.

References

External links
 

1997 births
Living people
Singaporean male sailors (sport)
Olympic sailors of Singapore
Sailors at the 2020 Summer Olympics – Laser
Place of birth missing (living people)
Asian Games medalists in sailing
Sailors at the 2010 Asian Games
Sailors at the 2018 Asian Games
Medalists at the 2010 Asian Games
Medalists at the 2018 Asian Games
Asian Games bronze medalists for Singapore